= Florida Cognitive Activities Scale =

Cognitive activity scale for elderly people

- Purpose: cognitive activity in elderly

The Florida Cognitive Activities Scale (FCAS) is a 25-item scale used to assess the cognitive activity in elderly populations. There are two subscales, the Higher Cognitive Abilities and Frequent Cognitive Abilities, and also a measure of self-reported maintenance of cognitive activity. The FCAS was developed in 2005 by staffmembers of the Veterans Administration Medical Center in Tampa, Florida.
